Qube or Qubes may refer to:

Technology 
QUBE, a former cable television system
Qube Software, London-based makers of 3D software Q (game engine)
Qubes OS, a security-focused desktop operating system
Qube Cinema, a company that makes digital cinema servers
Cobalt Qube, a server appliance produced by Cobalt
QUBE, a virtual learning software program by OpenQwaq

Video games 
Intelligent Qube, a 1997 puzzle video game
Q.U.B.E., a 2011 puzzle video game
Q*bert's Qubes, an arcade video game published in 1982

Buildings 
The Qube (Detroit), Quicken Loans office building in Detroit
The Qube (Vancouver), a distinctive "hanging" building in Vancouver, BC, Canada

Other 
Qube Holdings, an Australian transport company
QubeTV, a conservative video website
The Qube, a component of the game show Qubit

See also 
 Cube (disambiguation)
 PocketQube